A do not call list or do not call registry is a list of personal phone numbers that are off-limits to telemarketers in some countries. 
Do not call lists may also be held privately by a company, listing numbers that they will not call.

National registries
 Do Not Call Register (Australia)
 National Do Not Call List (Canada)
 National Customer Preference Register (India)
 New Zealand Name Removal Service
 Telephone Preference Service (United Kingdom)
 National Do Not Call Registry (United States)
 Do Not Call Registry (Singapore) 
 Bloctel (France)

See also 
 Robinson list, a type of opt-out registry of people who do not wish to receive marketing communications

References 

Telephony
Telemarketing
Former disambiguation pages converted to set index articles
Broad-concept articles